INS Garuda , is an Indian naval air station located in Kochi, in the state of Kerala. Commissioned on 11 May 1953, it is the oldest operating air station of the Indian Navy.

The air station is adjacent to INS Venduruthy and the headquarters of Southern Naval Command. INS Garuda is a major naval air training centre as well as an operational base.

History 
The original airstrip near Kochi was built by the Cochin Port Trust to transport senior officials of the British Harbour Corps from the Madras Presidency for supervising the development of modern Kochi port in 1936. During World War II, the rudimentary air strip was taken over by the Royal Air Force (RAF) in 1941 and expanded to establish a RAF experimental station. The Indian Air Force Volunteer Reserve (IAFVR) No. 5 Coastal Defence Flight, flying Westland Wapiti II aircraft was based at the station in May 1941. In December 1942, IAFVR No. 5 was disbanded, and resources transferred to HMS Garuda in Peelamedu (present day Coimbatore International Airport), Coimbatore,Tamil Nadu. In 1943, the Kochi facilities were transferred to the Royal Navy (RN) which established an aircraft repair yard at the location to assemble aircraft shipped to India for the war effort. HMS Garuda was decommissioned in September 1946 at the end of the war, and the Kochi infrastructure was transferred to the DGCA.

Post-independence
The Indian Navy acquired the first Short Sealand aircraft on 13 January 1953. The aviation facilities at Kochi were transferred to the Indian Navy and temporarily placed under the command of naval base, INS Venduruthy, on 1 January 1953 to prepare for operating the aircraft. The first Sealand aircraft arrived in Kochi from the UK on 4 February 1953.

The facilities were commissioned as a fully operational naval air station under the command of the Indian Naval Air Arm on 11 May 1953 and renamed INS Garuda. Commodore G Douglas, was its first Commanding Officer.

Since then, INS Garuda has remained a strategic operating station for the navy, with several training schools, intelligence centres, maintenance and repair facilities and experimental stations based here. A separate civil enclave for domestic travellers was allowed to operate at INS Garuda, which remained operational until July 1999, when the Cochin International Airport was commissioned. The 747 Squadron of the Indian Coast Guard was activated on 22 Apr 2002 within the premises of Naval Base Kochi. The Squadron operates two Dornier 228 aircraft.

Units
INS Garuda has 2 intersecting runways, allowing almost all operational aircraft to land and take off.

Indian Naval Air Squadrons based at INS Garuda as of 2011 include:
 INAS 550, a reconnaissance squadron operating Dornier 228 aircraft
 INAS 336, an anti-submarine warfare and advanced training squadron, operating Westland Sea King Mk 42B helicopters
 INAS 321, a search and rescue and logistics squadron, operating HAL Chetak helicopters
 INAS 342, operating IAI Heron and IAI Searcher Mk. II UAVs

INS Garuda also has a number of naval aviation training schools:

 Observer School trains pilots and technical personnel in maritime reconnaissance, patrol, evacuation and search and rescue (SAR) missions
 School for Naval Airmen (SFNA) and the Naval Institute of Aviation Technology (NIAT) impart theoretical training to naval aviation personnel and those associated with flying operations
 Aeronautical Training Institute (ATI) conducts training for officers and sailors in aircraft maintenance
 School for Naval Oceanography and Meteorology (SNOM)

INS Garuda also has facilities for imparting training in airborne anti-submarine operations affiliated with the Anti-Submarine Warfare (ASW) School on INS Venduruthy. The school's facilities include a Thales Underwater Systems LOFAR (Low Frequency Analysis & Recording) training simulator.

See also
 Indian Navy
 List of Indian Navy bases
 List of active Indian Navy ships

 Integrated commands and units
 Armed Forces Special Operations Division
 Defence Cyber Agency
 Integrated Defence Staff
 Integrated Space Cell
 Indian Nuclear Command Authority
 Indian Armed Forces
 Special Forces of India

 Other lists
 Strategic Forces Command
 List of Indian Air Force stations
 List of Indian Navy bases
 India's overseas military bases

References

External links

Airports in Kerala
Buildings and structures in Kochi
Garuda
Transport in Kochi
1953 establishments in India
Military airbases established in 1953